David Lee Gallagher (born February 9, 1985) is an American actor and former model. Beginning a prolific career as a child actor and model at the age of two, Gallagher is a five-time Young Artist Award nominee and Teen Choice Award winner. He is best known for his role as Mikey Ubriacco in Look Who's Talking Now and Simon Camden on 7th Heaven. He was Kevin Harper in Angels in the Endzone and Richie Rich in Richie Rich's Christmas Wish. Gallagher is also well known for the voice of Riku in the Kingdom Hearts video game series.

Early life
Gallagher was born in New York City to Elena Gallagher (née Lopez) and Darren James Gallagher. His parents separated when he was a baby and his mother remarried Vincent Casey. Gallagher is of Cuban descent on his mother's side and Irish descent on his father's side. He has four younger siblings. His brother Killian was diagnosed with autism and as a result David is an active supporter and spokesman for the organization Autism Speaks.

He graduated from Chaminade College Preparatory School (California) in 2003 and enrolled at the University of Southern California, where he majored in film and television studies, graduating in May 2007.

Career
Gallagher began acting at the age of 2, first modeling for print advertorials in and around New York City which eventually led to commercial work as an actor. He appeared in many television commercials as a toddler for products such as Tyson Foods and Fisher Price. At age 8 he briefly had a recurring role on the soap opera Loving.

His film debut came in 1993 when he won the role of Mikey Ubriacco in the movie Look Who's Talking Now, playing the son of John Travolta and the late Kirstie Alley and the older brother of Tabitha Lupien. In 1995 he played in a production of A Christmas Carol on Broadway. He also starred in several TV movies, including Bermuda Triangle.

In 1996, he reunited with John Travolta for the movie Phenomenon. Later that year, he was cast as Simon Camden in the family drama series 7th Heaven. 7th Heaven remained on the air for 11 seasons, making it the longest-running family drama in television history, and also became the highest-rated show on The WB.

He filmed a few movies during hiatuses from filming, including the direct-to-video Richie Rich's Christmas Wish and Little Secrets with Evan Rachel Wood. In 2003, during 7th Heavens 8th season, Gallagher left the show in order to attend college full-time. However, he returned to the series part-time during season 9 and for what was thought to be the 10th and final season. In late 2006 The CW unexpectedly picked up the show for an 11th season. Gallagher opted not to renew his contract.

In 2005 Gallagher starred in and co-produced a low-budget adaptation of The Picture of Dorian Gray.

His first role after leaving 7th Heaven was a guest stint on Numb3rs, playing serial killer Buck Winters in September 2006, a role which he reprised in January 2009. He also appeared in the season 6 opener of CSI: Miami, playing another suspected killer. He also starred in the horror sequel Boogeyman 2, which went straight to DVD. In July 2008, Gallagher guest-starred on the TNT drama Saving Grace as Paul Shapiro, a troubled young man who was the suspect in a murder investigation. His next guest appearance was in an October 2008 episode of the FOX crime drama Bones as Ryan Stephenson, the son of a transgender woman. Then in November 2008 he appeared in an episode of the CBS show Without a Trace as a suspect named Jeff Ellis who was thought to be responsible for the disappearance of a local nurse. He portrayed Seiji Amasawa in the English dub version of Studio Ghibli's Whisper of the Heart. Gallagher appeared on the second-to-last episode of the series The Deep End, where he played a man charged with second-degree murder although he is innocent.

In March 2012, Gallagher was announced to star with Jake Weber in Scared of the Dark directed by Takashi Shimizu.

Gallagher has notably voiced Riku in the numerous Kingdom Hearts video games and franchise since 2002.

Filmography

Film

Television

Video games

Awards and nominations

Award
2003: Teen Choice Awards 2003: Choice TV Actor: Action/Drama.

Nominations
1994: Young Artist Awards 1992-1993: Best Youth Actor Under 10 in a Motion Picture.
1997: Young Artist Awards 1995-1996: Best Performance in a TV Drama Series: Young Actor.
1998: Young Artist Awards 1996-1997: Best Performance in a TV Drama Series: Leading Young Actor.
1999: Young Artist Awards 1997-1998: Best Performance in a TV Series: Young Ensemble.
2002: Young Artist Awards 2000-2001: Best Performance in a TV Drama Series: Leading Young Actor.
2004: Teen Choice Awards 2004: Choice TV Actor: Action/Drama.

References

External links

20th-century American male actors
21st-century American male actors
American models
American entertainers of Cuban descent
Male actors from New York City
American male film actors
American male television actors
American male video game actors
American male voice actors
American people of Irish descent
Autism activists
Living people
People from Queens, New York
USC School of Cinematic Arts alumni
Hispanic and Latino American male actors
Chaminade College Preparatory School (California) alumni
1985 births